Sherbro may refer to:
 Sherbro people, a people of Sierra Leone
 Sherbro language, a language of Sierra Leone
 Sherbro Island, an island off the coast of Sierra Leone
 Sherbro River, a river in Sierra Leone

Language and nationality disambiguation pages